Melmore is a census-designated place in central Eden Township, Seneca County, Ohio, United States.  It has a post office with the ZIP code 44845.  It is located at the intersection of  State Routes 67 and 100.

Demographics

History
Melmore was platted in 1824. The name Melmore was formed from the Latin mel, meaning "honey", and the adjective -more; honey standing for Honey Creek, upon which the town is situated. A post office was established at Melmore in 1825, and remained in operation until 1993.

References

Census-designated places in Ohio
Census-designated places in Seneca County, Ohio